Abdel Kader Ben Kamel (born 1937) is a Moroccan weightlifter. He competed in the men's light heavyweight event at the 1960 Summer Olympics.

References

1937 births
Living people
Moroccan male weightlifters
Olympic weightlifters of Morocco
Weightlifters at the 1960 Summer Olympics
Sportspeople from Marrakesh